I Love U (or I ♥ U, see cover art) is the eleventh studio album by Japanese rock band Mr. Children on September 25, 2005. The album's first single, "Sign", released on May 26, 2004, was used as the theme song for the Japanese television drama, Orange Days. The second maxi single, titled "Yonjigen: Four Dimensions", released on June 29, 2005, contains four A-sides, "Mirai", "And I Love You", "Running High" and "Yooi Don", but it does not including "Yooi Don".

Track listing

2005 albums
Mr. Children albums
Albums produced by Takeshi Kobayashi
Japanese-language albums